The 1923 Chicago Maroons football team was an American football team that represented the University of Chicago during the 1923 Big Ten Conference football season. In their 32nd season under head coach Amos Alonzo Stagg, the Maroons compiled a 7–1 record, finished in third place in the Big Ten Conference, and outscored their opponents by a combined total of 134 to 22.

Notable players on the 1924 Chicago team included guard Joe Pondelik, end Elmer A. Lampe, fullback John Webster Thomas, and tackle Frank Gowdy. Fritz Crisler was an assistant coach on the team.

Schedule

References

Chicago
Chicago Maroons football seasons
Chicago Maroons football